The Waverly Hills Historic District is a national historic district located at Arlington County, Virginia. It contains 439 contributing buildings in a residential neighborhood in North Arlington. The area is the result of the combination of five separate subdivisions platted for development between 1919 and 1939.  The dwelling styles include a variety of architectural styles, including Tudor Revival, Colonial Revival, Dutch Colonial Revival, Bungalow / Craftsman, and Cape Cods.  Located within the district is the separately listed Glebe House (c. 1850).

It was listed on the National Register of Historic Places in 2004.

References

Houses on the National Register of Historic Places in Virginia
Tudor Revival architecture in Virginia
Colonial Revival architecture in Virginia
Historic districts in Arlington County, Virginia
National Register of Historic Places in Arlington County, Virginia
Houses in Arlington County, Virginia
Historic districts on the National Register of Historic Places in Virginia